Lucrezia Borgia is a melodramatic opera in a prologue and two acts by Gaetano Donizetti. Felice Romani wrote the Italian libretto after the play Lucrezia Borgia by Victor Hugo, in its turn after the legend of Lucrezia Borgia. Lucrezia Borgia was first performed on 26 December 1833 at La Scala, Milan.

Performance history
19th century

The first London production was at Her Majesty's Theatre on 6 June 1839 with Giulia Grisi and Mario. When the opera was staged in Paris (Théâtre des Italiens) in 1840, Victor Hugo obtained an injunction against further productions within the domain of French copyright law. The libretto was then rewritten and retitled La rinegata, with the Italian characters changed to Turks, and the performances were resumed.

The first English-language production was in London on 30 December 1843. The English tenor Sims Reeves was a noted Gennaro. Lucrezia was first presented in New Orleans on 27 April 1843 and then at New York's American Theatre on 11 May 1843  and later at the Palmo's Opera House in 1847: with Giulia Grisi in 1854; and with Thérèse Tietjens and Brignoli in 1876. It was given at the Academy of Music, Philadelphia, in 1882, and at the Metropolitan Opera House in New York, in 1904, with Enrico Caruso as Gennaro and Arturo Vigna conducting.

20th century and beyond

A famous performance of Lucrezia Borgia presented by the American Opera Society Ensemble in 1965 at Carnegie Hall with soprano Montserrat Caballé, who was making her American debut, was soon followed by a recording featuring Caballé, Shirley Verrett, Alfredo Kraus, and Ezio Flagello, conducted by Jonel Perlea, who also led the Carnegie Hall performance.

Lucrezia Borgia is often produced as a vehicle for a star soprano, including Leyla Gencer, Mariella Devia, Beverly Sills, Dame Joan Sutherland, Renée Fleming, Edita Gruberová and Sondra Radvanovsky.

Roles

Synopsis 

Time: Early 16th century
Place: Venice and Ferrara

Prologue
The Palazzo Grimani in Venice

Gennaro and his friends, including Orsini, celebrate on the brightly lit terrace, in front of which lies the Giudecca canal. The friends' conversation turns to Don Alfonso, Duke of Ferrara, to whose house they will be travelling the next day, and to his wife, the infamous Lucrezia Borgia. On hearing Lucrezia's name, Orsini tells of how Gennaro and he, alone in a forest, were warned by a mysterious old man to beware her and the entire Borgia family, and that the two of them would die together (Nella fatal di Rimini). Professing his boredom with Orsini's tale Gennaro wanders off and falls asleep nearby. His friends are invited to rejoin the festivities, and he is left alone.
A gondola appears and a masked woman steps onto the terrace. She hurries over to the sleeping Gennaro and observes him with affection. (Com'è bello! Quale incanto in quel volto onesto e altero!) She kisses his hand, he wakes and is instantly struck by her beauty. He expresses his love for her and sings of his childhood as an orphan brought up by fishermen. He adds that he loves dearly the mother he has never met. (Di pescatore ignobile esser figliuol credei.) The others return and instantly recognise her as Lucrezia Borgia, listing in turn the members of their families she has killed to Gennaro's horror.

Act 1

Ferrara

The Duke, believing Gennaro to be Lucrezia's lover, plots his murder with his servant Rustighello (Vieni: la mia vendetta è meditata e pronta.) Gennaro and his companions leave the house for a party and pass the Duke's palace with its large gilded coat of arms reading Borgia. Keen to show his contempt for the Borgia family, Gennaro removes the initial "B", leaving the obscene "Orgia" (orgy).

In the palace, Lucrezia is shown into the Duke's chamber. Having seen the defaced crest, she demands death for the perpetrator, not knowing that it is Gennaro. The Duke orders Gennaro to be brought before her and accuses him of staining the noble name of Borgia, a crime to which he readily confesses. Lucrezia, horrified, attempts to excuse the insult as a youthful prank, but Don Alfonso accuses Lucrezia of infidelity, having observed her meeting with Gennaro in Venice. In a scene full of drama and tension, she denies any impropriety, but he demands the prisoner's death and forces her to choose the manner of Gennaro's execution. Pretending to pardon him, the Duke offers Gennaro a glass of wine and he swallows it. After a stunning trio (Guai se ti sfugge un moto, Se ti tradisce un detto!) the Duke leaves and Lucrezia hurries to Gennaro, giving him an antidote to the poison the Duke has mixed with the wine. He drinks, and in a last duet, she implores him to flee the city and her husband. (Bevi e fuggi ... te'n prego, o Gennaro!)

Act 2

The palace of the Princess Negroni

Ignoring Lucrezia's advice, Gennaro attends a party at the palace, swearing never to be parted from his friend Orsini. Orsini leads the party in a brindisi or drinking song ("Il segreto per esser felici") and they drink. Lucrezia enters and announces that in revenge for their insults in Venice she has poisoned their wine and arranged five coffins for their bodies. She has hitherto believed that Gennaro fled Ferrara on her advice, and is thus dismayed when he steps forward and announces that she has poisoned a sixth. Orsini, Liverotto, Vitellozzo, Petrucci and Gazella fall dead. Gennaro seizes a dagger and attempts to kill Lucrezia, but she stops him by revealing that he is in fact her son. Once again she asks him to drink the antidote, but this time he refuses, choosing to die with his friends. In a final cabaletta ("Era desso il figlio mio"), Lucrezia mourns her son and expires.

Music 

The closing cabaletta "Era desso il figlio mio" was added by Donizetti upon insistence by renowned soprano Henriette Méric-Lalande, who created the role of Lucrezia Borgia. It is one of the most demanding arias in all the operatic repertoire, with trills and coloratura passages that demand extreme vocal agility. Donizetti later removed the aria because he believed it damaged the credibility of the ending.

Recordings

References
Notes

Cited sources
Ashbrook, William and Sarah Hibberd (2001), in  Holden, Amanda (Ed.), The New Penguin Opera Guide, New York: Penguin Putnam. .

Other sources
Allitt, John Stewart (1991), Donizetti: in the light of Romanticism and the teaching of Johann Simon Mayr, Shaftesbury: Element Books, Ltd (UK); Rockport, MA: Element, Inc.(USA)
Ashbrook, William (1982), Donizetti and His Operas, Cambridge University Press.  
Ashbrook, William  (1998), "Donizetti, Gaetano" in Stanley Sadie  (Ed.),  The New Grove Dictionary of Opera, Vol. One. London: Macmillan Publishers, Inc.   
Kobbé, Gustav, The Complete Opera Book, English edition (London and New York 1922), 339-343.
Loewenberg, Alfred (1970). Annals of Opera, 1597-1940, 2nd edition.  Rowman and Littlefield

Osborne, Charles, (1994),  The Bel Canto Operas of Rossini, Donizetti, and Bellini,  Portland, Oregon: Amadeus Press. 
Rosenthal, Harold and Warrack, John (1974), Concise Oxford Dictionary of Opera London & Oxford: Cambridge (Corrected edition)
Sadie, Stanley, (Ed.); John Tyrell (Exec. Ed.) (2004), The New Grove Dictionary of Music and Musicians.  2nd edition. London: Macmillan.    (hardcover).   (eBook).
 Weinstock, Herbert (1963), Donizetti and the World of Opera in Italy, Paris, and Vienna in the First Half of the Nineteenth Century, New York: Pantheon Books.

External links 
  Donizetti Society (London) website
 Libretto (in Italian)
 Italian libretto with English translation
 

Operas by Gaetano Donizetti
Italian-language operas
Operas
1833 operas
Opera world premieres at La Scala
Operas based on plays
Cultural depictions of Lucrezia Borgia
Libretti by Felice Romani